James or Jim Watkins may refer to:

 James Watkins (abolitionist) (born c. 1823), American abolitionist and autobiographer
 James K. Watkins (1887–1970), American football player and police commissioner
 James D. Watkins (1927–2012), United States admiral and Secretary of Energy
 Julian Christopher or James or Jim Watkins (born 1944), American actor
 James C. Watkins (born 1951), ceramic artist
 Jim Watkins (darts player) (born 1954), American darts player
 Jim Watkins (news anchor) (born 1956), former news anchor
 Jim Watkins (businessman) (born 1963), operator of 8chan and 2channel
 James Watkins (director) (born 1973), English film director and screenwriter
 Jimmy Watkins (born 1982), American cyclist
 James Watkins (researcher) (fl. 1970s–2010s), biomechanics and sports science researcher